Adilbek Mussin (born 4 October 1999) is a Kazakhstani swimmer. He competed in the men's 50 metre butterfly event at the 2017 World Aquatics Championships. In 2018, he won the bronze medal both in the men's 50 metre butterfly and the men's 4 × 100 metre medley relay events at the 2018 Asian Games held in Jakarta, Indonesia.

References

External links
 

1999 births
Living people
Kazakhstani male butterfly swimmers
Swimmers at the 2018 Asian Games
Asian Games bronze medalists for Kazakhstan
Asian Games medalists in swimming
Medalists at the 2018 Asian Games
Place of birth missing (living people)
Islamic Solidarity Games competitors for Kazakhstan
Islamic Solidarity Games medalists in swimming
21st-century Kazakhstani people